The Journal of Emergency Nursing is the official peer-reviewed journal of the Emergency Nurses Association, covering emergency nursing. It's published on behalf of the association by Elsevier and was established in 1983. The journal is abstracted and indexed in CINAHL, Science Citation Index Expanded, and Scopus. According to the Journal Citation Reports, the journal has a 2013 impact factor of 1.131.

References

External links 
 
 Emergency Nurses Association

Publications established in 1983
Elsevier academic journals
Emergency nursing journals
English-language journals
9 times per year journals